Petri Makkonen (Born 14 May 1988) is a Finnish professional pool player. Petri won the 2012 World Cup of Pool with partner Mika Immonen. Petri also won the 2015 German Open Euro Tour event, defeating Konrad Juszczyszyn 9–3 in the final.

At the European Pool Championships, Makkonen was the runner-up at the 10-Ball event, losing to David Alcaide, losing in the final 8–7.

Achievements
 World Cup of Pool (2012) - With (Mika Immonen)
 Euro Tour 
 German Open (2015)
 Finnish Pool Championship 
 10-Ball (2012, 2014, 2017, 2020)
 14.1 (2010, 2011, 2013)
 8-Ball (2012, 2014, 2017)
 9-Ball (2016)

References

External links

Finnish pool players
Living people
Finnish sportspeople
1988 births